Ryoko (stylized as RYOKO)  is a Japanese manga series written and illustrated by Kaito Mitsuhashi. It was serialized in Shogakukan's Weekly Shōnen Sunday from October 2016 to June 2019, with its chapters collected in five tankōbon volumes.

Publication
Ryoko is written and illustrated by Kaito Mitsuhashi. Mitsuhashi, at 21, won the Shin Shedai Sunday Award (New Generation Sunday Award) for his work Ryoko Meet Meal!! in December 2015. Takenori Ichihara, Shogakukan's Weekly Shōnen Sunday editor-in-chief, decided to make Ryoko a serialized work, being the first time in 38 years that an editor-in-chief directly chooses a newcomer's work to being serialized in the magazine, since Rumiko Takahashi's Kattena Yatsura (Urusei Yatsura prototype) in 1978.

The manga began in Weekly Shōnen Sunday on October 19, 2016. The manga went on hiatus after its 22nd chapter, published on March 29, 2017. The series resumed publication on January 23, 2019, and finished on June 26 of the same year. Shogakukan collected its chapters in five individual tankōbon volumes, which were released from February 17, 2017 to September 18, 2019.

Volume list

References

External links
Ryoko official website at Web Sunday 
 

Action anime and manga
Shogakukan manga
Shōnen manga